Malaya Cherga (Çiçke-Çargı) is a rural locality (a selo) and the administrative centre of malocherginskoye Rural Settlement, Shebalinsky District, the Altai Republic, Russia. The population was 216 as of 2016. There are 4 streets.

Geography 
Malaya Cherga is located 17 km northwest of Shebalino (the district's administrative centre) by road. Arbayta is the nearest rural locality.

References 

Rural localities in Shebalinsky District